A geometric lathe was used for making ornamental patterns on the plates used in printing bank notes and postage stamps. It is sometimes called a guilloché lathe. It was developed early in the nineteenth century when efforts were introduced to combat forgery, and is an adaptation of an ornamental turning lathe. The lathe was able to generate intersecting and interlacing patterns of fine lines in various shapes, which were almost impossible to forge by hand-engraving. They were used by many national mints.

Further reading
Peter Bower, 'Economic warfare: Banknote Forgery as a deliberate weapon', and Maureen Greenland, 'Compound plate printing and nineteenth-century bank notes,  in Virginia Hewitt, ed. The Banker's Art: Studies in paper money, pp 46–63, and pp 84–87, The British Museum Press, 1995,

See also
 Security printing
 Spirograph 
 Tusi couple
 Guilloché

External links
Ornamental Turning
CNC Turning vs Centerless Grinding

Money forgery
Automatic lathes